Thirteen Years is an album by Alejandro Escovedo. The cover painting is by Jack Smith.

Critical reception
Ira Robbins, in Trouser Press, wrote that "the album — a testament to patience and virtue — is a marvel of presentation more than content."

Track listing
All tracks composed by Alejandro Escovedo and Stephen Bruton
"Thirteen Years Theme" – 0:49
"Ballad of the Sun and the Moon" – 4:33
"Try, Try, Try" – 4:35
"Way It Goes" – 4:54
"Losing Your Touch" – 3:56
"Thirteen Years" – 4:03
"Thirteen Years Theme" – 1:10
"Helpless" – 4:37
"Mountain of Mud" – 3:48
"Tell Me Why" – 3:47
"Thirteen Years Theme" – 1:25
"She Towers Above" – 4:50
"Baby's Got New Plans" – 4:51
"The End" – 3:41
"Thirteen Years Theme" – 1:03

Personnel
Alejandro Escovedo	 - 	guitar, vocals
Dave McNair	 - 	guitar, percussion
Turner Stephen Bruton	 - 	electric guitar
Charlie Sexton	 - 	electric guitar
Cid Sanchez	 - 	electric guitar
Marty Muse	 - 	pedal steel guitar
Terry Wilson	 - 	bass
Barry "Frosty" Smith	 - 	drums, percussion
David Bender	 - 	drums
Megan Levin	 - 	harp
Susan Voelz	 - 	violin
Danny Levin	 - 	violin
David Perales	 - 	violin
Frank Kammerdiener	 - 	cello
Tom Canning	 - 	piano, keyboards
Jon Blondell	 - 	trombone section
Mickey Raphael	 - 	harmonica
Malford Milligan	 - 	vocal extraordinaire, harmony vocal
Bobby Neuwirth	 - 	harmony vocal
Bill Averbach - arranger on "Ballad of the Sun and the Moon"

References

1994 albums
Alejandro Escovedo albums